Gilles Grondin (3 February 1943 – 18 July 2005) was an educator and a politician from Quebec, Canada. He was a Member of the House of Commons of Canada from 1986 to 1988.

Background

He was born in Shawinigan-Sud, Quebec. He attended Saint-Georges school and Séminaire Sainte-Marie, where he eventually worked as a librarian, and served as a dean of men at the local CEGEP. He received his Bachelor of Library Science (BScLib) from the Université de Montreal.

Local politics

Grondin served as Mayor of Shawinigan-Sud from 1977 to 1985.  He did not run for re-election in 1985 and was succeeded by Claude Pinard.

Member of Parliament

On 29 September 1986, Grondin won a by-election and filled the seat left by Jean Chrétien, becoming the Liberal Member for the district of Saint-Maurice. Chrétien had left federal politics in February that year and would stay out of office until he became Liberal party leader and subsequently Prime Minister.

After serving in the remaining months of the 33rd Canadian Parliament, Grondin left federal politics and did not campaign in the 1988 federal election. He was succeeded by Denis Pronovost of the Progressive Conservative Party.

Death

He died in 2005 after several years of dealing with cancer.

References

External links
 
 Gilles Grondin biography at the city of Shawinigan

1943 births
2005 deaths
Members of the House of Commons of Canada from Quebec
Mayors of places in Quebec
Liberal Party of Canada MPs
Séminaire Sainte-Marie alumni
Université de Montréal alumni
Deaths from cancer in Quebec